Rasulpur newada is a village of Kamsaar in Ghazipur district, Uttar Pradesh, India. As of 2011 census the main population of Rasulpur lived in an area of 7.5 acres.

Histrorical population

References

Towns and villages in Kamsar